Simeon Petrov (born 12 January 2000) is a French-born Bulgarian professional footballer who plays as a defender for CSKA 1948 Sofia.

Career
Born in Limoges, France, in a family of Bulgarian emigrants, Petrov  started his football career in the local academy of Limoges. In 2018 he joined Gazélec Ajaccio, before moving to Bulgaria in 2019 and joining the second-level team of Strumska Slava. On 24 May 2020 he joined the newly promoted to First League team of CSKA 1948.

International career

Petrov was born in France to Bulgarian parents, which makes him eligible for both France and Bulgaria national teams. He received his first call up for the Bulgaria U21 team in November 2020 for the 2021 European Under-21 Championship qualifying match against Estonia U21, but was recalled 2 days before the match due to a positive COVID-19 test.

Career statistics

Club

References

External links

2000 births
Living people
Bulgarian footballers
First Professional Football League (Bulgaria) players
Second Professional Football League (Bulgaria) players
FC Strumska Slava Radomir players
FC CSKA 1948 Sofia players
Association football central defenders